Transcription initiation factor TFIID subunit 6 is a protein that in humans is encoded by the TAF6 gene.

Function 

Initiation of transcription by RNA polymerase II requires the activities of more than 70 polypeptides. The protein that coordinates these activities is transcription factor IID (TFIID), which binds to the core promoter to position the polymerase properly, serves as the scaffold for assembly of the remainder of the transcription complex, and acts as a channel for regulatory signals. TFIID is composed of the TATA-binding protein (TBP) and a group of evolutionarily conserved proteins known as TBP-associated factors or TAFs. TAFs may participate in basal transcription, serve as coactivators, function in promoter recognition or modify general transcription factors (GTFs) to facilitate complex assembly and transcription initiation. This gene encodes one of the smaller subunits of TFIID that binds weakly to TBP but strongly to TAF1, the largest subunit of TFIID. Four isoforms have been identified but complete transcripts have been determined for only three isoforms. One of the isoforms has been shown to preclude binding of one of the other TFIID subunits, thereby reducing transcription and initiating signals that trigger apoptosis.

Interactions 

TAF6 has been shown to interact with:
 TAF5  and
 TATA binding protein.

References

Further reading

External links